Robert John Raven is an Australian arachnologist, being the Head of Terrestrial Biodiversity and the Senior Curator (Arachnida) at the Queensland Museum. Dr Raven has described many species of spider in Australia and elsewhere, and is spider bite consultant to the Royal Brisbane Hospital, leading to much work on spider toxins.

References

External links
 Dr Robert Raven at Queensland Museum
 Arachnids research at Queensland Museum

Australian arachnologists
Living people
Year of birth missing (living people)